Cultural property comprises the physical items that are part of the cultural heritage of a group or society, as opposed to less tangible cultural expressions. They include such items as cultural landscapes, historic buildings, works of art, archaeological sites, as well as collections of libraries, archives and museums.

Cultural property is legally protected by a number of international agreements and national laws. There is intensive cooperation between the United Nations, UNESCO and Blue Shield International on the protection of cultural goods.

Definition
There is no universally agreed-upon definition of cultural property. One widely used definition is provided by Article 1 of the Hague Convention for the Protection of Cultural Property in the Event of Armed Conflict of 1954:

"The term 'cultural property' shall cover, irrespective of origin or ownership:
(a) movable or immovable property of great importance to the cultural heritage of every people, such as monuments of architecture, art or history, whether religious or secular; archaeological sites; groups of buildings which, as a whole, are of historical or artistic interest; works of art; manuscripts, books and other objects of artistic, historical or archaeological interest; as well as scientific collections and important collections of books or archives or of reproductions of the property defined above;
(b) buildings whose main and effective purpose is to preserve or exhibit the movable cultural property defined in sub-paragraph (a) such as museums, large libraries and depositories of archives, and refuges intended to shelter, in the event of armed conflict, the movable cultural property defined in sub-paragraph (a); 
(c) centers containing a large amount of cultural property as defined in sub-paragraphs (a) and (b), to be known as 'centers containing monuments'."

Cultural heritage has been described as the 'most distinguishing form of a culture's expression'  and includes both tangible and intangible elements such as 'traditional dances, customs and ceremonies'. Cultural property is the essential elements of a culture that allow it to determined and identified.

Emblem

Article 16 of the Convention describes the internationally recognized mark for cultural property as follows:
(1) The distinctive emblem of the Convention shall take the form of a shield, pointed below, persaltire blue and white (a shield consisting of a royal-blue square, one of the angles of which forms the point of the shield, and of a royal-blue triangle above the square, the space on either side being taken up by a white triangle).
Use of the Emblem is restricted under international humanitarian law. Guidance for using the emblem is available from The Blue Shield, and UNESCO.

See also
 Heritage asset
 Heritage site
 World Heritage Site
 National Heritage Site
 National Monument
 Philippine Registry of Cultural Property
 National Commission for Culture and the Arts

References

International law
Cultural heritage